Berlin Alexanderplatz can refer to:

 Berlin Alexanderplatz, a 1929 novel by Alfred Döblin
 Berlin-Alexanderplatz (1931 film)
 Berlin Alexanderplatz (2020 film)
 Berlin Alexanderplatz (miniseries), a 1980 TV serial
 Berlin Alexanderplatz station, a railway station

See also
 Alexanderplatz